Khalid al-Tuwaijri is a former chief of the Royal Court of King Abdullah of Saudi Arabia who was the highest ranking non-prince in the kingdom until his ousting by King Salman in 2015. 

At chief of the royal court, al-Tuwaijri became the most powerful official in the Saudi Royal Family as the King's gatekeeper and confidant, where he would be the first and last to see the king during decision-making meetings, and controlling who and what information would be presented before the King.

Biography
Al-Tuwaijri was born in 1960 and studied law in Saudi Arabia; after which he then obtained a master's degree in political science in the United States and another in Islamic criminal law, on returning to Saudi Arabia. He is an author and poet.

He commissioned into the Saudi Arabian civil service in 1995, aged 35, and rotated across several positions until he became chief of the Crown Prince's Court, replacing his father Abdulaziz al-Tuwaijri, a decade later in early 2005. On his ascension, King Abdullah appointed him chief of the Royal Court on 9 October 2005, replacing another commoner, Mohammed bin Abdullah Al Nuweisir, and secretary-general of the Allegiance Council in 2007. In 2011 he cemented his power by replacing Prince Abdul Aziz bin Fahd as chief of the Cabinet Court, which would be merged with the Royal Court and so resulting in bringing all government business under his purview. As the secretary general, he had a say in the staffing of all the monarchy's senior positions. 

Al-Tuwaijri also became chief of the Royal Guard, and as a signal mark of the King's trust and favour was given other court positions. As chief of the Royal Guard, al-Tuwaijri would be in charge of personal security of the King as well as the royal court at large.

By the time of the King Abdullah's death al-Tuwaijri became unpopular with some senior princes, who described him as an "octopus," "the head of corruption","the black box" and the "patron of the secularists" due to his huge influence and power on directing the royal court, and by extension the Kingdom's affairs. It was reported that Prince Mishaal, then the eldest surviving brother of the King Abdulaziz, used to refer to al-Tuwaijri as King Khalid because of his immense influence in the Royal Court in Riyadh.

Al-Tuwaijri was also denounced as the prime leader of the "westernization project" in Saudi Arabia, and was accused of trying to "shield" the king by preventing most of the Royal Family members from meeting him in his role as gatekeeper to the King.

Several media sources reported the disappearance of al-Tuwaijri as soon as King Abdullah died, and many believed his removal was in effect defeat of the liberal faction led by the late King and his most favoured son Miteb, Minister of the National Guard, and a candidate for deputy crown prince.

Arrest

On 4 November, 2017, Khaled al-Tuwaijri was arrested in Saudi Arabia in a "corruption crackdown" conducted by a purported anti-corruption committee. Along with other senior princes Khaled al-Tuwaijri was freed in January 2018.

References

Khalid
1960 births
Living people
King Saud University alumni
Khalid
Saudi Arabian prisoners and detainees